‘Abdul-Basit ‘Abdus-Samad, or Abdel Basit Abdel Samad, or Abdul Basit Muhammad Abdus Samad (1927 – 30 November 1988) was an Egyptian Quran reciter and Hafiz and is regarded as one of the best reciters of the Quran who ever lived. He had won three world Qira'at competitions in the early 1970s. ‘Abdus-Samad was one of the first huffaz to make commercial recordings of his recitations and the first president of the Reciters' Union in Egypt. At 10, Abdul Basit finished learning the Quran. He also learned 7 styles of Quran recitation by the age of 12 and the 10 styles by 14.  He came to be called the Golden Throat and the Voice of Heaven due to his melodious style, breath control, and unique emotional and engaging tone. He has a son, Tareq Abd El Basit Abd El Samad, who is also a known sheikh in Egypt; he has done many interviews on his father's life, family and career.

Early life 
Sheikh Abdul Basit Abdul Samad was born in the year 1927 in the village of Al-Maarazeh situated in Qena Governorate (Egypt). From a very early age, he was very committed with the memorization and recitation of the Quran. His grandfather, Sheikh Abdul Samad, was well-known for his memorization of the Quran and known for his ability to memorize the Quran according to its rules of recitation (al-tajwid and al-ahkam). His father, Muhammad Abdul Samad, was also one of the great reciters of the Quran and worked as a civil servant in the Ministry of Communications.

Sheikh Abdul Basit Abdul Samad had two older brothers, Mahmoud and Abdul Hamid Abdul Samad. Both brothers were memorizing the Quran at the Madrasa, so their younger brother Abdul Basit joined them when he was six years old. The teacher of Abdul Basit noticed that his young student was quick in his memorization and very observant and keen to follow his teacher with all the pronunciation of the letters and the stop and start positions. His teacher also noticed his talent for recitation and great voice.

Education 
Sheikh Abdul Basit Abdul Samad completed his memorization of the Qur'an at the age of ten and then requested his grandfather and father to continue his education with the Qira’at (recitations). They both agreed and sent him to the city of Tanta (Lower Egypt) to study the Quranic recitations (‘ulum al-Quran wa al-Qira’at) under the tutelage of Sheikh Muhammad Salim. Although the distance to travel to Tanta was very far, the young student was convinced and prepared to travel the long distance since this would lay an important foundation for his future.

One day before his departure to Tanta, the family heard about the arrival of Sheikh Muhammad Salim to the Religious Institute in Armant in order to settle there as a teacher of Recitations. The people received and welcomed him in the best way, because he was well known for his knowledge and abilities as a scholar of the Quran. It was as if fate brought this scholar to his family at the right time. The people of the city established an association in Asfun Al-Matanah to preserve the Quran, so that Sheikh Muhammad Salim could teach the memorization of the Quran and its recitations. Abdul Basit went to him and reviewed the entire Qur’an with him, and then memorized the Al-Shatibia, which is the classical text of the science of the seven recitations.

When Sheikh Abdul Basit reached the age of twelve, requests came from all the cities and villages of Qena Governorate (Egypt), especially Asfun Al-Matanah, with the help of Sheikh Muhammad Salim, who recommended Sheikh Abdul Basit everywhere he went, as Sheikh Salim's testimony was trusted by all people.

Career 
Sheikh Abdul Basit Abdul Samad officially started his career as a Quran reciter in Cairo at the age of 23, when he was invited to attend the celebration of the birth of Sayyida Zainab. On the final night of the celebration, the guests were greeted by the top reciters of the era, namely Sheikh Abdul Fattah Al-Shashaa’i, Sheikh Mustafa Isma’il, Sheikh Abdul Azim Zahir, Sheikh Abu Al-Aynayn Sha’iisha, and others. The young Sheikh Abdul Basit was trying to find a place for him among the audience of listeners to listen to these famous giants, see them and sit with them.

After midnight, Sheikh Abdul Basit was accompanied by one of his relatives, who knew the officials in the Sayyida Zainab Mosque. He asked them for permission so that Sheikh Abdul Basit could also recite. He said: “I present to you a reader from Upper Egypt, whose voice is sweet and beautiful, and he will recite to you for ten minutes.” At that moment, the mosque was completely full to end, and the audience listened to his amazing voice that took the hearts of the listeners to the point that all attendees of the mosque yelled on top of his voice “Allah Akbar” ("God is the greatest"). Every time Sheikh Abdul Basit wanted to finish the recitation with “Sadaqallahul Azim” ("Allah Almighty has spoken the truth"), the audience insisted that he keeps on reading and he continued for about two hours and finished the recitation in the early morning. 

After this experience, Sheikh Abdul Basit began to think about applying to the radio station as a Quran reciter, but he hesitated a lot due to his affiliation with the Upper Egypt, nevertheless, he choose to pursue a career as a Quran reciter. Sheikh Abdul Basit was appointed as a Quran reciter on the radio in the year 1951.

Travels

Sheikh Abdul Basit Abdul Samad travelled to several places, including:

 He travelled to Pakistan and was received by the Pakistani President at the airport.
 In 1955, he travelled to Jakarta, Indonesia, where the people received him in the best way. The mosque was filled with attendees and they were outside the mosque for a distance of about a kilometer. The square opposite the mosque was filled with more than a quarter of a million Muslims listening to the Sheikh standing on their feet until dawn.
 He also travelled to South Africa, and upon his arrival, officials sent him radio and television journalists to interview him.
 He also travelled to India to celebrate a major religious ceremony held by one of the rich Muslims there. After his arrival, Sheikh Abdul Basit faced a moving situation. All those present were taking off their shoes and standing on the ground and they bowed their heads down looking at the place of prostration and their eyes overflowed with tears crying until the Sheikh finished recitation and his eyes tears shed from this humble attitude.
 He also travelled to Jerusalem and read in the Al-Aqsa Mosque as well as the Ibrahimi Mosque in Hebron in Palestine and the Umayyad Mosque in Damascus and the most famous mosques in Asia, Africa, the United States, France and London.

Honours and awards 
Through the travels of Sheikh Abdul Basit Abdul Samad around the world, he received a large number of honours and awards.

 In 1956, Syria honoured him and awarded him the Order of Merit. He received the Order of Cedar from Lebanon, the Golden Medal from Malaysia, a medal from Senegal, and another medal from Morocco.
 A Medal from the Prime Minister of Syria in 1959.
 A Medal from the Prime Minister of Malaysia in 1965.
 The Order of Merit from the Senegalese President in 1975.
 The Golden Medal from Pakistan in 1980.
 The Order of Scholars from Pakistani President Zia-ul-Haq in 1984.
 The Egyptian Radio Medal on its fiftieth anniversary.
 The Order of Merit from the former Egyptian President Hosni Mubarak during the celebration of the Day of Preachers in 1987.
 In 1990, he received the last honours after his departure from former President Mohamed Hosni Mubarak in the celebration of Laylat al-Qadr.

Illness and death 
He suffered from complications from diabetes later in life, but his liver problems coincided with diabetes, and he could not fight these two conditions together. He contracted hepatitis less than a month before his death. He was admitted to a hospital but his health deteriorated further. This prompted his children and doctors to advise him to travel London for treatment, where he stayed for a week. He was accompanied by his son Tariq, who asked to take him back to Egypt.

He died on Wednesday, November 30, 1988,  and his funeral was national and official at the local and global levels. So great was the attendance at his funeral, it included ambassadors of various countries attending on behalf of their people, as well as kings and heads of state, in appreciation of his role in the field of advocacy in all its forms. His surviving relatives included (from oldest to the youngest): Yasir, Hisham, and Tariq. Following his father's footsteps, Yasir also became a Qari. In 2006, a mosque in his native village of Armant in Luxor, Southern Egypt, was opened under his name.

References

External links 
 Abdul Baset Biography  at assajda.com
 Abdul-Basit Abdus-Samad at quran-e-majeed.com
 

Egyptian Quran reciters
Egyptian imams
1927 births
1988 deaths